The Art of Seduction is a 2005 South Korean romantic comedy film starring Son Ye-jin, Song Il-gook and directed by Oh Ki-hwan. It was released on 21 December 2005.

Plot
Min-jun (Song Il-gook) and Ji-won (Son Ye-jin) are so-called the first-rate "players" who are dating gurus with 100% success rates in any dating pursuits. Following her usual systematic dating rules, Ji-won fakes a schematic car accident to capture Min-jun's attention and successfully approaches him.

However, her smooth-sailing dating life finally encounters turbulence. Why in the world is this guy not succumbing to her alluring charm? Min-jun is also overwhelmed by the understanding that he has met his match. However, like the veteran players that they are, these two shouldn't show any signs of weakness in their dating tactics. Who will emerge victorious and become the last player standing?

Cast
Son Ye-jin as Han Ji-won
Song Il-gook as Seo Min-jun
Noh Joo-hyun as Min-jun's father
Hyun Young as Ji-won's friend
Park Jun-gyu as CEO Bong
Ahn Sang-tae as Fortune teller
Yoon Yeong-joon as No Do-cheul
Ahn Sun-young as Oh Ji-yeong
Kim Ae-kyung as Park Yeo-sa
Woo Hyun as guard / pawnshop owner

References

External links

2000s Korean-language films
2005 romantic comedy films
South Korean romantic comedy films
Showbox films
2000s South Korean films